Packwood is an unincorporated community and census-designated place (CDP) located in easternmost Lewis County, Washington, in the United States. As of the 2020 census, the CDP had a population of 319, while the town and surrounding Packwood community (east of Cora Bridge) had a total population of 1,277.

Packwood was originally established as Sulphur Springs. Shortly thereafter, it was renamed to Lewis, in honor of Meriweather Lewis, but was finally renamed to Packwood, in honor of William Packwood due to the US Postal Service confusing the town with Fort Lewis.

History
The name "Packwood", used for the town, a mountain pass, and a lake, honors William Packwood, a Virginian pioneer and explorer of Oregon and Washington. Packwood and James Longmire were tasked by the Washington Territorial Legislature to chart a low pass over the Cascade Range, this necessitated by the deaths of several delegates in their journey to the first legislative session. As a mark of their successes in this venture, the charted pass - called the Packwood Saddle - is still unused by any road, trail, or other conveyance to pass between the east and west sides of the Cascades.

Geography
Packwood is located at  (46.6040008, -121.6778664), at the intersection of US Highway 12 and Gifford Pinchot National Forest Road 52 (Skate Creek Road). It is located between Mount Rainier National Park to the north and Mt. St. Helens National Volcanic Monument to the south. The Tatoosh Wilderness, Goat Rocks Wilderness, and William O. Douglas Wilderness are to the north, southeast, and northeast respectively, with the Gifford Pinchot National Forest as a buffer in all directions. Packwood is located in the upper Cowlitz River valley, just downstream of the confluence of the Muddy and Clear forks of the Cowlitz. The White Pass Ski Area and crest of the Cascade Range demark the eastern edge of the Packwood area, the town of Randle the west, and large expanses of forest, wilderness, and parkland the north and south.

Surrounding lands, including the residential communities of High Valley and Timberline, contribute to an approximate population of 1,330 for the greater Packwood area.

Climate
According to the Köppen Climate Classification system, Packwood has a warm-summer Mediterranean climate, abbreviated "Csb" on climate maps.

Economy
The town of Packwood has historically relied on the forest products industry as an economic engine, supplemented by government employment (via the National Forest and Park Services) and seasonal tourism. In the late 1990s, the Forest Service began consolidation of many ranger stations, with the result that Forest Service jobs moved to the town of Randle and the new Cowlitz Valley Ranger Station. Shortly thereafter, several factors, including the Asian financial crisis, decreased logging on federal lands, and depression in lumber prices, brought the closing of the Packwood Lumber Mill. Due to the limited economic opportunity, the town's housing consists heavily of summer housing for snowbirds, retirement homes, and vacation cabins. The influx of retirees and determination of long-time locals has led to a recent civic revival in the town, however. Several local organizations seek to promote the tourism opportunities of the town, improve tourist and vacation infrastructure, and plan for the long-term economic revitalization of the town. The decades-old Annual Packwood Flea Market now attracts tens of thousands during the Memorial Day and Labor Day weekends, and the recently expanded White Pass Ski Area provides a steady flow of visitors during the otherwise tourism-slow winter months. A new art gallery, along with a heritage museum housed in the old school building, are indicative of increasing diversity and economic revitalization in the area.

Government and politics

Politics

Packwood is recognized as being majority Republican and conservative, though less so in comparison to other rural towns within Lewis County.

The results for the 2020 U.S. Presidential Election for the Packwood voting district were as follows:

 Donald J. Trump (Republican) - 103 (52.82%)
 Joe Biden (Democrat) - 88 (45.13%)
 Jo Jorgensen (Libertarian) - 2 (1.03%)
 Other candidates - 2 (1.03%)

The surrounding Big Bottom voting precinct shows similar results:

 Donald J. Trump (Republican) - 387 (56.01%)
 Joe Biden (Democrat) - 286 (41.39%)
 Jo Jorgensen (Libertarian) - 12 (1.74%)
 Other candidates - 6 (0.87%)

Education

Packwood is located in the White Pass School District, which, in addition to Packwood, covers the small towns of Randle and Glenoma and the vast forested expanse in extreme eastern Lewis County, terminating at the crest of the Cascades and the border with Yakima County. In 2004, the town's school-age population dropped to the point that the local K-6 elementary school was shuttered, although the building is still used as a county sheriff's substation, a local historical museum, and for hosting other community events.

Infrastructure

Packwood is accessible year-round by private vehicle on US 12, and seasonally by SR 123 and several forest service roads. The general aviation Packwood Airport is located three blocks west of highway 12 in downtown Packwood, and L.E.W.I.S. Mountain Highway Transit provides multiple weekday public transportation to Centralia-Chehalis, including connections to Amtrak and Greyhound.

References

External links
 
 Washington Deputy Dies After Hitting Elk

Unincorporated communities in Washington (state)
Unincorporated communities in Lewis County, Washington
Census-designated places in Washington (state)
Census-designated places in Lewis County, Washington
Gifford Pinchot National Forest